The 13th State Affairs Commission (SAC) of North Korea was elected by the 4th Session of the 13th Supreme People's Assembly on 29 June 2016. It was replaced on 11 April 2019 by the 14th SAC.

Officers

Chairman

Vice Chairman

Members

4th SPA Session (2016–18)

6th SPA Session (2018–19)

References

Citations

Bibliography
Books:
 

13th Supreme People's Assembly
State Affairs Commission
2016 establishments in North Korea
2019 disestablishments in North Korea